Marx Reichlich (1460–1520) was an Austrian painter. 

Reichlich was a painter of primarily religious works. He painted a number of traditional scenes as commissions for churches, including "Adoration of the Magi", and "The Last Judgement". 
Some of his works reside at the Kunsthistorisches Museum.

References

1460 births
1520 deaths